Qutuqtu was the second son of Tolui and Lingqun Khatun (daughter of Kuchlug). He was the grandson of Genghis Khan. Although he took part in Ogedei Khan's invasion of Song, Qutuqtu was killed in battle against the Song general Meng Yu (孟珙).

Family 
Although Qutuqtu left no male descendants, he had a daughter, Kelmish Agha, who was instrumental in cementing the Yuan-Golden Horde alliance. Kelmish, married to Saljidai Gurkhan, gave birth to a daughter, Oljai Khatun. Oljai married Mengu-Timur (a descendant of Jochi) and gave birth to Toqta Khan of the Golden Horde.

Qutuqtu's full-sister, Ile Temür, married Pars Buqa, grandson of Quduka Beki of the Oirat tribe.

Ancestry

References 

13th-century Mongolian people